The Haifa Oil Refinery massacre took place on 30 December 1947 in Mandatory Palestine. It began when six Arabs were killed and 42 wounded after members of the Zionist paramilitary organisation, the Irgun, threw a number of grenades at a crowd of about 100 Arab day-labourers. These Arab day-labourers had gathered outside the main gate of the then British-owned Haifa Oil Refinery to look for work.

Minutes after this Irgun attack, Arab refinery workers and others began attacking the Jewish refinery workers, resulting in 39 deaths and 49 injuries, before the British army and Palestine Police units arrived to put an end to the violence. This came to be known as the "Haifa Oil Refinery massacre". Haganah later retaliated by attacking two nearby Arab villages in what became known as the Balad al-Shaykh massacre, where between 21 and 70 Arabs were killed, while skirmishes followed in Haifa.

Background
Relations between Jews and Arabs at the refinery were known to be good. However, tensions rose in 1947–48 in the wake of the 1947 UN Partition Plan. On 30 December 1947, Irgun militants hurled two bombs into a crowd of Arab workers from a passing vehicle. Irgun who planned the attack on the day laborers said it was in retaliation for recent attacks elsewhere on Jews in Palestine. After 6 workers were killed and 42 wounded, Arab workers stormed the refinery armed with tools and metal rods, beating 39 Jewish workers to death and wounding 49. British forces arrived only an hour after the riot started. According to the Jewish Agency, some Arab workers helped their Jewish co-workers hide or escape.

The Jewish Agency condemned the Irgun for the "act of madness" that preceded the killing of Jewish workers at the Haifa oil refinery, but at the same time authorized retaliation. The Haganah mounted a retaliatory raid which became known as the Balad al-Shaykh massacre on the villages of Balad al-Shaykh and nearby Hawassa, where some of the Arab refinery workers lived. They fired into and blew up houses. Some women and children were injured when, according to Haganah accounts, Arabs returned fire from the houses. Haganah estimates of the number of Arabs killed varied from 21 to 70, including one woman. In addition, two Haganah soldiers were killed during the fight. Zachary Lockman wrote that, "... the Jewish attackers killed some sixty men, women, and children and destroyed several dozen houses.

References

Bibliography

External links

 continuation
'The British Withdrawal From Palestine: Possible Advance Of Date By Six Weeks, 17 Killed in Attack On Arab Village', The Times, Friday, 2 January 1948; pg. 4; Issue 50958; col A.

1948 Arab–Israeli War
1947 in Mandatory Palestine
Mass murder in 1947
December 1947 events in Asia
Massacres in 1947
Irgun
Haganah
Massacres in Mandatory Palestine